Aeroflot Flight 411 was an international scheduled flight from Sheremetyevo Airport, Moscow to Freetown, Sierra Leone via Dakar in Senegal. Early on 6 July 1982, the four-engined Ilyushin Il-62 crashed and was destroyed by fire after two engines were shut down shortly after take-off. All 90 passengers and crew on board died as a result of the crash.

Aircraft
The accident aircraft was an Ilyushin Il-62M, with registration SSSR-86513. Its first flight was in November 1980 and it had flown slightly more than 4,800 hours prior to the accident. The Il-62's four jet engines are mounted in pairs, on pylons either side of the rear fuselage.

Accident
The aircraft took off from Moscow's Sheremetyevo Airport at 12:33am with 80 passengers and 10 crew on board. Within seconds the engine fire warning for No. 1 engine was annunciated. The crew shut down the engine and discharged the engine fire extinguishers. Less than a minute later the engine fire warning for No. 2 engine was also annunciated and the crew shut this engine down as well. A passenger from Sierra Leone survived the initial crash and subsequent fire, but died on the evening of 8 July.

Investigation
Post-crash examination of the engines found no pre-crash damage or signs of in-flight fire – the fire warnings were false. The fire warning system was almost completely destroyed by the crash and fire and the reason for the false warnings could not be determined; although there had been nine reported instances of bleed air leaks causing spurious engine fire warnings on Il-62s between 1975 and the date of the crash, this was ruled out as a cause.

It found no fault with the pilots' actions, who could not make a forced landing because of the dark and the urban areas on the ground below. The investigation found the pilots had followed flight manual procedures; however there was no procedure in the flight manual to cover the situation in which they found themselves.

Notes

References

Aviation accidents and incidents in 1982
Aviation accidents and incidents in the Soviet Union
Aviation accidents and incidents in Russia
Airliner accidents and incidents caused by instrument failure
Accidents and incidents involving the Ilyushin Il-62
1982 disasters in Russia
411
July 1982 events in Europe